John Taylor Oxley, Jr. (October 13, 1881 – November 10, 1925) was an American track and field athlete who competed in the 1904 Summer Olympics. He was born on October 13, 1881. In 1904 he participated in long jump competition, but his exact placement is unknown. He died in Morrison, Illinois on November 10, 1925.

References

External links
list of American athletes

1881 births
1925 deaths
American male long jumpers
Olympic track and field athletes of the United States
Athletes (track and field) at the 1904 Summer Olympics
People from Morrison, Illinois